Ann H. Cook (  1725 –  1760) was an English cookery book writer and innkeeper.

Living in Hexham, Northumberland, Cook, and her husband John, became embroiled in a feud with a well-connected local landowner, Sir Lancelot Allgood, following an argument over an invoice the Cooks had issued. Although they were later exonerated, Allgood continued his attack on them, forcing them to leave their inn and move. Their finances suffered and John was imprisoned for non-payment of debts. To earn money, Cook wrote Professed Cookery in 1754; in the work, in addition to a range of recipes, she included a poem and an "Essay upon the Lady’s Art of Cookery". This was an attack on Allgood's sister Hannah Glasse, who had published a best-selling cookery book, The Art of Cookery Made Plain and Easy in 1747.

Professed Cookery was published in three editions, 1754, 1755 and 1760. In the first two of these, Cook was stated as living in Newcastle upon Tyne; in the third she was living in lodgings in Holborn, London. There are no records of the dates or locations of her birth and death.

Life

Little is known about Ann Cook's early life, although she was probably born in the late 1690s in County Durham. According to an autobiographical account she included in her cookery book, she worked as a cook and housekeeper. She married John Cook around 1725–1727; he was the licensed tenant of the Black Bull Inn in Hexham, Northumberland. The couple had at least two daughters—the eldest of whom was born in 1728—and three sons.

In 1739–1740, during the Lent circuit of the assizes, Sir Lancelot Allgood, who held positions high sheriff and Member of Parliament sent a message to the Black Bull that the visiting judge and his party would want six bottles of good French wine, and that John Cook should order them in. The judge was dissatisfied with the wine and sent a message to Allgood's estate to borrow wine from there; Allgood sent him the bottles as a gift. As the original six bottles of wine had been consumed, John charged them to Allgood's account. When Allgood and the judge met, they came to the erroneous conclusion that John had charged the judge for the gifted wine. Allgood publicly accused the landlord of cheating him, and threatened to ruin him, resulting a feud between the two, partly inflamed by Ann's defence of her husband.

In late 1745 the Cooks moved from the Black Bull to Morpeth, Northumberland, where they ran the Queen's Head inn on behalf of the landlord, Thomas Pye. To secure their position, they entered into a bond of £369 with Pye. What the Cooks did not know was that Pye was a cousin of Allgood; in 1746 Allgood accused Cook of being a crook and a Jacobite—the Jacobite rising of 1745 still continued and was causing fear and panic in many parts of northern England. The persecution continued in 1749 when Pye instigated a rumour that because the Cooks were selling their household possessions, they were insolvent and on the verge of abandoning the town. In reality they were giving some of their unneeded possessions to their eldest daughter who had recently married and was running an inn with her new husband in Newcastle upon Tyne. By this stage the Cooks had paid back £320 of the £369 bond, so they sold much of their remaining goods and also moved to Newcastle with the intention of setting up a pastrycook shop. They were followed by their creditors for the balance of the bond, and who would not allow any terms of easy settlement; John was taken to a debtors' prison within a month of their arrival in the new town. Nothing further is known of John Cook.

According to Gilly Lehmann, Cook's biographer for the Dictionary of National Biography, it appears that in order to earn money, Cook wrote The New System of Cookery, which was on sale by February 1753. The title page of the work stated the book was "sold by the Author, at her House in the Groat-market" in Newcastle.

When the work was published in 1754 it was under the title Professed Cookery. This also contained a poem and an "Essay upon the Lady’s Art of Cookery"; both the poem and essay were an attack on Allgood's sister Hannah Glasse, who had published a cookery book, The Art of Cookery Made Plain and Easy in 1747; the work was a best-seller and made Glasse one of the best-known writers of the time. Cook's criticism covered 66 pages of the work; one part of the poem, accusing Glasse of plagiarism, reads:

While the attacks on Glasse were described by the historian Madeleine Hope Dodds as a "violent onslaught", and by Lehmann as "appalling doggerel", much of Cook's criticism about the recipes and treatment of food is warranted. Although Glasse ridiculed the expense of ingredients in other cookery books, many of her own recipes are unnecessarily extravagant. Cook refers to Glasse's plagiarism of the works of others; Glasse extensively used other sources during the writing: of the 972 recipes in the first edition, 342 had been copied or adapted from other works without attribution.

A second edition of Professed Cookery was published in 1755, which added a "Plan of House-keeping" to the contents. Cook's address was again given on the title page as a house on the Groat-market. A third edition of Professed Cookery was published around or after 1760; its title page described that Cook was a lodger at the house of Mr Moor, a cabinet maker, in Fuller's Rents, Holborn, London. It is not known what became of her after this edition was published.

Notes and references

Notes

References

Sources

 
 
 
 
 
 
 
 
 
 
 
 
 
 

18th-century English women writers
English food writers
English non-fiction writers
Women cookbook writers